Porgy is the second studio album by the American band When People Were Shorter and Lived Near the Water, released in 1991 by Shimmy Disc. It contains covers of songs from Porgy and Bess.

Critical reception
Trouser Press called the album "a well-informed piece of work, not simply a cheap parody." The New York Times wrote that the band "specializes in satire ... When People Were Shorter isn't smug; this group's love of bad taste seemed honest and heartfelt."

Track listing

Personnel
Adapted from Bobby liner notes.

When People Were Shorter and Lived Near the Water
 David Licht – drums
 Robert Meetsma – guitar, banjo, fiddle, cornet, saxophone, tambourine, percussion, vocals
 Kim Rancourt – vocals, flute
 David Raymer – guitar, vocals
 Dave Rick – bass guitar

Additional musicians
 Paul Defilipps – vocals, trombone
 Frank London – trumpet
 Tom Varner – French horn
Production and additional personnel
 Kramer – production
 Paco Simon – cover art
 Chris Xefos – engineering

Release history

References

External links 
 

When People Were Shorter and Lived Near the Water albums
1991 albums
Shimmy Disc albums
Albums produced by Kramer (musician)
Porgy and Bess music recordings